Leucopaxillus albissimus is a species of mushroom that lives as a saprobe, decaying the litter under coniferous trees. It produces a large white fruiting body that is unusually resistant to decay. It is considered to be inedible.

Description
The species is generally white, with albissimus meaning 'whitest' in Latin.

The cap of Leucopaxillus albissimus is 4–20 cm wide, and slowly changes from convex to plane; occasionally the disc is depressed. When young, the margin is incurved and faintly striate. The cap's surface is dry, unpolished, and smooth; in moderate weather, it becomes scaled and a shade of cream to cream-buff. As it ages, the cap's surface turns buff-tan. Overall, the flesh is white, moderately thick, and has a mild odor. Gills are crowded, broad, and decurrent. Although they are originally cream-colored, the gills turn buff-tan with age. Varying from 3–7 cm in length, the stipe of Leucopaxillus albissimus is 2.5–4 cm thick, stout, and often enlarged at the base. The surface of the stipe varies from smooth to finely-scaled and is a cream color when young; it may turn buff-tan in age. When handled, it bruises pale buff-brown at the base.

Leucopaxillus albissimus has a white spore print. The elliptical spores are ornamented with amyloid warts. The spores measure 5–7 x 3.5–5 µm.

While the biological reason for the trait is unknown, the species demonstrates a tendency not to rot.

Habitat
Primarily residing under conifers and hardwoods, Leucopaxillus albimissus is often scattered or gregarious in arcs or rings. It fruits from mid to late winter in California, and in autumn in other parts of North America.

Similar species
Leucopaxillus gentianeus is closely related. Clitocybe species may appear similar due to the decurrent gills.

References

Fungi described in 1873
Fungi of North America
Inedible fungi
Taxa named by Charles Horton Peck
Tricholomataceae